openSNP is an open source website where users can share their genetic information. Users upload their genes, including gender, age, eye color, medical history, Fitbit data. With a focus on user patient-led research (PLR), there is potential to redefine the way health research is conducted. The name of the project is inspired by single nucleotide polymorphism (SNP), which is a DNA variation at a specific location on a strand. Scientists have discovered that there is a correlation between certain SNPs and genetic predispositions such as Mendelian disease.

The code of the project is on GitHub and the CSS is licensed under the Apache 2.0 license.

Potential risks 
Since openSNP is an open-sourced social network that is readily available on the internet, there have been questions raised surrounding privacy issues and other risks. Though the sign-up page warns potential users of the record lasting forever, participants must decide for themselves whether the benefits outweigh the pitfalls. As health research continues to progress, more and more scientific analysis places a greater role on PLR, leading to increased demands for a new social contract to secure conditions for participants. Human participant research not only places subjects into potentially harmful situations, but also can lead to other risks such as exploitation and self-experimentation under non-controlled environments. There is also the risk of biases and distortions "arising from self-reporting and self-collected data". However, at this current state and time, the effects of genetic discrimination are unknown due to the lack of evidence. Still with the rise of open genomic research, privacy protection frameworks need strengthened efforts beyond "traditional legal and organizational safeguards", technical solutions such as data encryption, and mutual understanding. In a study an article done through the University of San Diego School of Law, Sejin Ahn discovered that perhaps the most critical solution that needs to be strengthened is the legislative ban on re-identification and anti-discrimination protection. Ahn explains that these remedies must be addressed and updated in order to protect participants from privacy breaches.

A survey of users of the site found that while most respondents 'were well aware of the privacy risks of their involvement in open genetic data sharing and considered the possibility of direct, personal repercussions troubling, they estimated the risk of this happening to be negligible'.

Potential benefits 
The website provides a proof-of-concept mechanism for allowing anyone to be involved in any stage of genomics research. This model allows partnerships to form which can be independent of governments, academia or for-profit organisations and is a way of creating the enabling conditions for anyone access, influence and get involved in every stage of the genomics research cycle. The model reflects the value that users of such sites attach to sharing data as 'contributing to the common good of research'.

The transparent open-source code arguably allows greater scrutiny and oversight than similar closed-source projects.

History 
The website was founded by German biologist, Bastian Greshake.

In 2012, Greshake sent a vial of his saliva to 23andMe, a genomics company, to study his own DNA. His results suggested that he was at risk of prostate cancer, and then recommended to his father to receive a medical examination as well. The doctor found a growing tumor in his father's prostate and was able to catch it early. After receiving his results, he posted them on GitHub, hoping to find other users willing to share their personal genetic makeup. Upon realizing that many people were unwilling or did not include a lot of information that was necessary for scientific research, Greshake created openSNP.Though Greshake acknowledges that there are services that allow people to test their own genes and discover inherent predispositions, they are often expensive, or difficult to access. In 2013, the Food and Drug Administration (FDA) forced company 23andMe to stop marketing their spit-box screening tests due to lack of scientific evidence. However, in 2015, the FDA eased their restrictions and stated that carrier screening tests would not have to undergo preliminary review.

Greshake hopes that by making openSNP accessible and simple, it will not only attract the general public to get interested in their genetic makeup, but also to take it down innovative avenues, such as turning openSNP data into music.

Timeline 
 September 2011 - openSNP is released.
 September 2012 - Fitbit data inclusion feature added, seeing as obesity is correlated with specific SNPs.
 May 2014 - The website reached 1000 genotypings.
 September 2015 - Crowdfunding campaign started on Patreon platform.
 February 2016 - Code of Conduct is created that outlines appropriate behavior and general guidelines.
 August 2016 - openSNP was a participant of Google Summer of Code.

References

Genealogy websites
Genealogy databases